Sekolah Menengah Kebangsaan Bandar Baru Ampang (SMKBBA)
() is situated in the town of Bandar Baru Ampang, Selangor, Malaysia. The school motto is the Malay phrase: Berilmu dan Beramal.
SMKBBA was established on 1 January 2002 with 383 students and 32 teachers. The principal is Tuan Haji Abdul Gaffar bin Kunchi Mohd.

Identities

Missions 
SMKBBA will strive to use all resources available to:

1. Improve the quality of management and services by improving management and administration and financial management of schools.

2. Improve academic performance and personality development of students through curriculum strengthening, students affair management, and curriculum management.

3. Improve the professionalism of the organization through the consolidation of human resource management.

4. Creating a school culture that is conducive for strengthening the physical development management and community relations.

Objectives 
To foster collaboration and harmonious relationship between the school and community.

To produce outstanding individuals who have high noble and self-esteem.

To create an environment that is conducive to the development of potentials of individuals.

To show the edifice as a clean, cheerful and beautiful school.

History 

Sekolah Menengah Kebangsaan Bandar Baru Ampang started operating on 1 January 2002. In the early stage, the school had to operate in SMK Tasik Permai for a year due to the delay in the school's building completion. In the first year, the school consisted of 7 Remove classes, 6 Form 1 classes which held 383 students. It had 32 teachers and 5 staff.

The first Principal (known as the Headmaster) of SMK Bandar Baru Ampang is Tuan Haji Abdul Gaffar bin Kunchi Mohd from Kajang, Selangor. On 28 November 2002, YB Tan Sri Musa Mohamed, The Minister of Education Malaysia visited the building site.

On 1 January 2003, the construction work of the school was done and the secondary school was moved to its location in Bandar Baru Ampang, Selangor with permission from the Minister of Education Malaysia. At that time, SMK Bandar Baru Ampang consisted of five Remove classes, ten Form1 classes and five Form2 classes, with a total of 742 students. There were 40 teachers and 6 staff.

Magazine 

The school magazine of the SMKBBA is named the Cemerlang. It is published annually by the Cemerlang Editorial Board.

Academics

Compulsory 
Certain subjects are compulsory:
 Bahasa Melayu / Malay Language
 English / Bahasa Inggeris
 Islamic Education / Pendidikan Islam - for all Muslim students
 Moral Knowledge / Pendidikan Moral - for all non-Muslim students
 History / Sejarah
 Mathematics / Matematik
 Science / Sains (counted as a compulsory subject for non-Science stream students)

Elective

Science stream 
 Additional Mathematics / Matematik Tambahan
 Physics / Fizik
 Chemistry / Kimia
 Biology / Biologi
 EST - English for Science and Technology

Commerce Stream 
 Additional Mathematics / Matematik Tambahan
 Basic Economies / Ekonomi Asas
 Business Studies / Perdagangan
 Principles of Accountancy / Prinsip Akaun

Art Stream 
 Sastera Melayu / Malay Literature
 English Literature / Kesusasteraan Inggeris
 Arts / Pendidikan Seni Visual
 Tamil Literature / Kesusasteraan Tamil

Additional 
Below are the additional subjects student can choose from:
 Mandarin / Bahasa Mandarin
 Tamil Language / Bahasa Tamil

Gallery 

Schools in Selangor
Secondary schools in Malaysia
Educational institutions established in 2002
2002 establishments in Malaysia